Para Draine (born December 28, 1972) is an American female boxer who has been a world champion two times. She is a former 112 pounds and current 115 pound champion. Draine stands 5 feet eight inches (68 inches) tall, making her relatively tall for a boxer of her weight.

Draine's nicknames are "Hurricane" and "The Spokane Spike". The latter nickname reflects the city she currently resides at. Draine has fought a large part of her fights in the American Northwest, specially in Worley, Idaho, but, because of her achievements, she has become well known in the world of boxing.

Her first professional fight came on May 14, 1997, when she defeated Dolores Lira by a four round decision, at Worley. Her first knockout win was on June 25 of that same year, when she beat Trena Drotar in the fourth round. Draine won her first five fights.

After she beat the experienced Sue Chase in her fifth fight, she and her management team thought she was ready for a world title try, so, on November 12, she challenged Theresa Arnold for the IBA's women's version of the world Bantamweight title. She lost that fight by a ten round split decision.

Draine then decided to go down in weight and try to become a world Flyweight champion. After two wins, including one over the famed British boxer Michelle Sutcliffe, she challenged the WIBF world Flyweight champion, Yvonne Trevino. On August 8, 1998 at Spirit Lake, North Dakota, Draine became a world champion by beating Trevino by a ten round split decision. She is a boxer who often jumps from one division to another, so she returned to the Bantamweight division. Despite losing her next fight, she got a world title try in her first fight at as a Super Bantamweight: On April 18, 1999, she and Silke Weikenmeyer fought for the vacant WIBF Super Bantamweight title. In what was Draine's first overseas fight, she lost a ten round decision in Germany.

Next, she beat two well known opponents, Jo Wyman and Brenda Burnside, before once again returning to the Flyweight division, to make her first title defense: on April 6, 2000, she lost her title to the then 8-0 Margaret Sidoriff, in Toronto, Ontario, Canada.

Draine kept fighting well known female boxers after losing that fight: she beat Robin Pinto, lost to Yvonne Caples, drew (tied) with Marylin Salcedo, and beat Bridgett Riley before receiving another world title shot.

On December 18, 2002, she and Salcedo were rematched, with the vacant IFBA world Super Flyweight title on the line. Draine became world Super Flyweight champion by defeating Salcedo with a split decision.

Draine has had one more fight after that, but she remains, on record anyway, active as a professional boxer.

Her career record is of 13 wins, 6 losses and 1 draw, with two knockout wins.

Professional boxing record

References

External links
 

1972 births
Living people
American women boxers
Boxers from Washington (state)
Super-bantamweight boxers
21st-century American women